Personal is the nineteenth book in the Jack Reacher series written by Lee Child.
The novel was published on 28 August 2014 in the UK, New Zealand, Australia and Ireland, and on 2 September 2014 in the United States and Canada. The plot of the book revolves around Reacher's pursuit of a sniper who has attempted to assassinate the President of France. This book is written in the first person.

Synopsis

Someone has taken a shot at the president of France in the City of Light. The bullet was American-made. The distance between the gunman and the target was exceptional. How many snipers can shoot from three-quarters of a mile with total confidence? Very few, but John Kott—an elite American marksman gone bad—is one of them. And after fifteen years in prison, he’s out, unaccounted for, and likely drawing a bead on a G8 summit packed with enough world leaders to tempt any assassin.

If anyone can stop Kott, it’s the man who beat him before: retired Military Police investigator Jack Reacher. And though he’d rather work alone, Reacher is teamed with Casey Nice, a rookie analyst who keeps her cool with Zoloft. But they’re facing a rough road, full of ruthless mobsters, Serbian thugs, close calls, double-crosses—and no backup if they’re caught. All the while Reacher can’t stop thinking about Dominique Kohl, a young subordinate he once failed to save when he sent her to arrest a suspect, and she was killed, and he swears it won't happen this time.

The powerful General Tom O'Day sends him undercover to Paris to discover who's behind the murder attempt; in order to find the culprit and, above all, to save the oncoming G8 meeting which is going to be held in London. Reacher finds out that the dangerous gang using snipers - among whom there's Kott, arguably - has actually got a base in London, namely in Chigwell, where Charlie White, an old man helped by a notorious gang called the "Romford Boys", runs a bunch of gangsters who do business with Serbians and now are threatening to aim higher at the G8.

Reacher, together with Casey Nice, manages to approach White's general quarters, where a giant who goes by the name of Joseph (Little Joey) Green, defends the castle.
But Reacher confronts and kills Joey, enters the house and kills Kott, too; then he comes back to the States to meet O'Day, the general who proposed the mission to him; but not to thank him, but to frame him.

Kott, White and Green were criminals, but they were not threatening the G8; O'Day wanted Kott simply to become more powerful politically; and he had sold Reacher to him in advance; whether the winner would be Kott or Reacher, he might have pretended to have saved the world. Reacher leaves him alone, but orders him not to say a word or he would raise a scandal and waste him; and a short time after the story he reads that O'Day has killed himself; but Reacher has already left town.

Reception 
Personal topped The New York Times Best Seller list of combined print and e-book fiction books for the week of 21 September 2014.

It won the 2014 RBA Prize for Crime Writing, a Spanish literary award said to be the world's most lucrative crime fiction prize at €125,000.

References

External links
 
 

2014 British novels
English novels
Jack Reacher books
Novels set in London
First-person narrative novels
Novels about the Serbian Mafia
Bantam Press books